Marsalforn (Pronounced: Marsa el-Forn, | Maltese: Marsalforn), also written as M'Forn for shortcut purposes, is a town on the north coast of Gozo, the second largest island of the Maltese archipelago. The town lies between the hill-top towns of Xagħra and Żebbuġ. Associated with this town there is also the bay of Qbajjar. The town is part of the Żebbuġ local council. Marsalforn is one of the most popular tourist resorts on Gozo. It is well served with hotels, guest houses, restaurants, bars, and beaches. There is only a one small sandy beach in Marsalforn, however, along the rocky coastline there are a number of interesting swimming spots.

Public structures 

 a Roman Catholic church
 a police station
 a major bus stop
 7 diving centers
 a hotel, a guesthouse and a couple of apartments for rent
 20 restaurants
 6 shops and supermarkets
2 bays, including Qbajjar

Nature 

 a major sandy beach and some swimming spots
 a public garden and a park

Name
Marsalforn is a composite word. "Marsa" is an Arabic word meaning ‘port’ or ‘bay’. There is disagreement on the origin of the second part of the word - ‘forn’. Forn means "a bakery" in Maltese and Arabic, but it is highly improbable that this has anything to do with Marsalforn, for it is unlikely that a bakery would be built in an area with a small population. It is quite likely that this name, like that of other Gozitan ports, might refer to a type of ship. In that case it would derive from Liburna, an Illyrian type of a ship, which became livurna in Greek, and lifurna in Arabic. The name might also have been derived from forna, a word used by Gozitan fishermen to refer to "a cave hollowed out by the sea". There are several of these in Marsalforn, the best known being Għar Qawqla ‘the cave at the steep hill’.

Emblem 
The emblem of Marsalforn consists of a blue shield representing Marsalforn harbour, encircled by a golden border. Saint Paul, according to tradition, left for Rome, after his shipwreck, from Marsalforn; hence the emblem of Saint Paul: a viper encircling the sword. The viper refers to the episode involving Saint Paul just after his shipwreck on Malta as recorded in the Acts of the Apostles.

Geography
To the south of Marsalforn is a fertile valley named after the town. The valley is bounded by several hillocks and used to be known as the "haven of hillocks". The most famous of these is tas-Salvatur (Our Saviours Hill) also referred locally as Tal-Merzuq Hill (Ray of Light) due to the legends surrounding it, recorded by Giovanni Abela in the seventeenth century.

This volcano like hill has acquired the attention of the people since 1901, when a large wooden cross was erected on its peak. Three years later, when Gozo was consecrated to Christ the Saviour, a stone statue of Christ replaced the cross. This was in turn replaced by a gigantic concrete statue towering twelve metres above the hill, which remains to this day.

As recorded in the Acts of the Apostles, Paul the Apostle was shipwrecked in Malta, but legend maintains that it was from Marsalforn that he embarked for Sicily and Rome. Today, this legend is symbolised by the town's emblem, which consists of a viper encircling a sword. This refers to an episode involving Saint Paul when he remained unharmed after being bit by a viper. The town church of  'Saint Paul Shipwreck' is also dedicated to the memory of Saint Paul departure from Marsalforn. The church, originally raised in the fourteenth century, has been rebuilt and enlarged many times. The foundation stone of the present church was laid in 1730. The feast is celebrated on 10 February every year.

To the west, over a small headland, lies a smaller bay, Qbajjar.

History

Early history 
Marsalforn has a history which dates back to Roman times. Until the sixteenth century, the port was the most important in Gozo. Imported food supplies from Sicily were unloaded at Marsalforn, and it was from there that passengers boarded to travel to Licata in Sicily and other continental ports.

Sixteenth to seventeenth century 
By the late sixteenth and early seventeenth centuries the Knights of the Order of Saint John, the rulers of Malta at the time, considered abandoning the old Citadel in the centre of the island and building a new town overlooking the port. Hostility from the Gozitan people meant that the plans were never realised. They protested that they were too poor to pay the extra tax needed to finance the move and the disruption caused by the transfer of their homes from Victoria to Marsalforn would be too great. 

Marsalforn's church, St Paul's Church, was built in 1730. It was restored in 1939.

With the development of Mġarr harbour, Marsalforn lost its importance and for several centuries, it remained a quiet fishing town inhabited by a small community of fishermen and their families.

Modern history 
During the siege of Malta, on 12 April 1942, Marsalforn was hit by several bombs.

On 19 May 2019, the Ministry for Gozo installed a WWII memorial commemorating the attack on Marsalforn on 3 March 1942.

Economy
The growth in the twentieth century of tourism on the Maltese island has led to a redirection of the town's economic function away from fishing. Today, although fishing remains an important industry, increasingly tourism is becoming the dominant source of employment for the local people. In the last thirty years the town has seen considerable urban expansion and has gradually extended along the crescent-shaped rocky bay towards Qbajjar. This expansion has been spurred by the growth in tourism in Gozo which has meant that several hotels, guesthouses and apartments have been built in the town. Moreover, the desire by wealthy Maltese and Gozitans for second homes in the town, combined with the increasingly large presence of foreign investors in the local housing market, has fuelled high demand for property in the town. It has also meant that the old palazzini that Marsalforn was noted for have been sacrificed and in their stead apartment blocks have been built.

One effect of tourism has been the establishment of clear tangible seasonal changes in the town's character. During the winter months, when tourist numbers are low and second homes are frequently not used, the town gains a quiet, peaceful feel. During summer, the town is a busy, vibrant place, teeming with both local and foreign visitors.

The town has also become the premiere diving centre in Gozo, with several scuba diving schools located on the sea front.

Demographics 
Historically, the town might have always had less than a thousand residents, due to historical invasions occurring in the town and the migration of locals to other towns in Gozo and Malta in search of better job opportunities, while eventually settling in those towns.

The town might currently have around 500 to 1,000 permanent residents, with the Maltese people being the largest ethnic group, although no official statistics are provided as Marsalforn forms part of the locality of Żebbuġ.

Immigrant population 
The town is one of the most multicultural spots in Gozo, with foreigners likely to form nearly half of all the town's residents.

The main foreign groups include Britons, Italians, Serbs, Germans and Libyans. The town is also home to the largest African community as a percentage of the total population in Gozo.

It is also very likely that the tourists who come during the summer season, who are predominantly foreign, can form a significant majority of the town's total temporary and permanent population between the months of June and September, as Marsalforn's population can increase by hundreds in a matter of hours during the day.

Religion 
The town is predominantly Roman Catholic, like the rest of the towns in Gozo, although no official statistics are provided. The town might also have a significant immigrant Muslim community.

Administrative Committee 
The Committee Members of Marsalforn are responsible for all administrative matters regarding Marsalforn.

Current Marsalforn Committee Members 

 Diane Tagliaferro - Executive Secretary
 Maria Saliba - Chairperson
 Frank Fenech - Chairperson Deputy
 Martin Cefai - Member
 Sandra Grech - Member
 Joseph Zammit - Member

References

External links

Coordinates: 

Populated places in Malta
Gozo
Żebbuġ, Gozo